Edward Gilbert ( – August 2, 1852) was an American newspaper editor and Democratic California politician. From 1850 to 1851, he served briefly as a member of the United States House of Representatives.

Biography 
Gilbert was born in Cherry Valley, New York.

During the Mexican–American War of 1846–48, he served in the US Army. After his regiment arrived in San Francisco, California in 1847, Gilbert was discharged from service and chose to remain in California.

In 1849, Gilbert partnered with businessman Edward Kemble and printer G. O. Hubbard to found the Alta California weekly paper, where Gilbert worked as senior editor for the next four years.

Political career 
In September 1849, Gilbert became the youngest delegate to the Constitutional Convention, winning the San Francisco delegate position with 1,512 out of the 1,519 votes cast. He was elected in November 1849 at-large as one of California's first two Representatives in the 31st Congress, and served from September 11, 1850, until March 3, 1851.

Duel and death 
In 1852, Gilbert wrote an article that charged General James W. Denver with "negligence and gross mismanagement" in an expedition to aid destitute immigrants, and the increasing conflict between Gilbert and Denver finally led Gilbert to challenge him to a duel. After several missed shots from both men, Denver shot Gilbert in the abdomen, killing him.

Gilbert was interred in Laurel Hill Cemetery, San Francisco. Later, after the city banned cemeteries within city-limits, his remains were removed and buried in the Laurel Hill Mound mass grave of Cyprus Lawn Memorial Park in Colma.

References

External links

1819 births
1852 deaths
19th-century American newspaper editors
19th-century American politicians
American politicians killed in duels
American military personnel of the Mexican–American War
Burials at Cypress Lawn Memorial Park
Burials at Laurel Hill Cemetery (San Francisco)
Deaths by firearm in California
Democratic Party members of the United States House of Representatives from California
Duelling fatalities
People from Otsego County, Michigan
Year of birth uncertain